Crithmum is a monospecific  genus of flowering plant in the carrot family Apiaceae, with the sole species Crithmum maritimum, known as  rock samphire, sea fennel or samphire. The name "samphire" is also used for several other unrelated succulent halophyte species of coastal plant.

Sea fennel, or Rock samphire, is an edible wild plant. It is found on coastlines throughout much of Europe (north to the British Isles), Macaronesia, parts of West Asia and North Africa in the Atlantic, Mediterranean and Black Sea coasts.

History, trade and cultivation
In the 17th century, Shakespeare in King Lear referred to the dangerous practice of collecting rock samphire from cliffs. "Half-way down, Hangs one that gathers samphire; dreadful trade!" In the 19th century, samphire was being shipped in casks of seawater from the Isle of Wight to market in London at the end of May each year. Rock samphire used to be cried in London streets as "Crest Marine".

In England, rock samphire is cultivated in gardens, where it grows readily in a light, rich soil. In the United Kingdom the uprooting of wild plants is illegal under the Wildlife and Countryside Act.
The reclaimed piece of land adjoining Dover, called Samphire Hoe, is named after rock samphire. The land was created from spoil from the Channel Tunnel, and rock samphire used to be harvested from the neighbouring cliffs.

Culinary use
Rock samphire or sea fennel has fleshy, divided aromatic leaves that Culpeper described as having a "pleasant, hot and spicy taste"

The stems, leaves and seed pods may be pickled in hot, salted, spiced vinegar, or the leaves used fresh in salads.

Sea fennel pickle in olive oil or vinegar is a traditional food of Italy (Marche region), Croatia (Dalmatia), Greece, and Montenegro (Bay of Kotor). It is known as Paccasassi del Conero and used as an antipasto, to accompany fish and meat dishes and to garnish pizza and sandwiches.

Richard Mabey gives several recipes for rock samphire, although it is possible that at least one of these may refer to marsh samphire or glasswort (Salicornia europaea), a very common confusion.

Properties
Sea fennel has nutritional value, and is rich in antioxidants.

References

External links
BBC Gardeners' Question Time – where there is apparently some confusion between the glasswort (marsh samphire, found in Suffolk) and the rock samphire (found in Dorset).
Biff Vernon discusses the common confusion between marsh samphire and rock samphire, and reproduces a poem on the subject by William Logan.
Botanical.com
Rinci.it
PubMed.gov
PubMed.gov

Edible Apiaceae
Leaf vegetables
Stem vegetables
Halophytes
Flora of Europe
Flora of Asia
Flora of North Africa
Flora of Macaronesia
Apioideae
Monotypic Apioideae genera